The North Midland Brigade was an infantry formation of Britain's Volunteer Force from 1888 to 1908.

Origins
The North Midland Brigade had its origin in the Stanhope Memorandum of December 1888. This proposed a Mobilisation Scheme for units of the Volunteer Force, which would assemble by brigades at key points in case of war. In peacetime the brigades provided a structure for collective training. Under this scheme the Volunteer Battalions of the Lincolnshire and the Sherwood Foresters (Derbyshire) Regiments would assemble at Derby. Later the Leicestershire Battalion was added. The Brigade formed part of Northern Command.

Organisation
The brigade had the following composition:
 Headquarters: Drill Hall, Derby
 1st Volunteer Battalion, Leicestershire Regiment (joined from South Midland Brigade)
 1st Volunteer Battalion, Lincolnshire Regiment
 2nd Volunteer Battalion, Lincolnshire Regiment
 3rd Volunteer Battalion, Lincolnshire Regiment (raised 1900; attached to Humber Brigade for training)
 1st Volunteer Battalion, Derbyshire Regiment
 2nd Volunteer Battalion, Derbyshire Regiment
 1st (Robin Hood) Nottinghamshire Rifle Volunteer Corps
 4th (Nottinghamshire) Volunteer Battalion, Derbyshire Regiment
 Supply Detachment, later designated an Army Service Corps Company
 Bearer Company, later part of the Royal Army Medical Corps

Colonel Charles Pierrepont, 4th Earl Manvers (known by the courtesy title of Viscount Newark until 1900) was appointed to command the brigade on 15 January 1896.

Boer War
All the battalions provided volunteers to serve alongside the Regular regiments in the 2nd Boer War and gained the Battle honour South Africa 1900–02.

The brigade was split into two in 1901, forming the Sherwood Foresters Brigade and the Leicester and Lincoln Brigade, each of four battalions. The Sherwood Foresters' HQ remained at Derby under the command of Earl Manvers, the Leicester and Lincolns were based at Lincoln under the commander of the regimental district. However, on 1 June 1906 all the Volunteer brigadiers received new commissions, and Earl Manvers was reappointed to the re-amalgamated North Midland Brigade.

Territorial Force
When the Volunteers ere subsumed into the newTerritorial Force in 1908 under the Haldane Reforms, the North Midland Brigade was incorporated into a new North Midland Division. It was once again split into two brigades of four battalions each: the Lincoln and Leicester Brigade, based at Grantham and the Nottingham and Derby Brigade (later the Sherwood Foresters Brigade) at Nottingham. These brigades, and their 2nd Line duplicates, fought on the Western Front during World War I

Commanders
 Col Charles Pierrepont, 4th Earl Manvers, VD, (known by the courtesy title of Viscount Newark until 1900) was appointed to command the brigade on 15 January 1896, and reappointed on 1 June 1906.

Notes

References
 Maj A.F. Becke,History of the Great War: Order of Battle of Divisions, Part 2a: The Territorial Force Mounted Divisions and the 1st-Line Territorial Force Divisions (42–56), London: HM Stationery Office, 1935/Uckfield: Naval & Military Press, 2007, .
 Ian F.W. Beckett, Riflemen Form: A study of the Rifle Volunteer Movement 1859–1908, Aldershot: Ogilby Trusts, 1982, .
 Col John K. Dunlop, The Development of the British Army 1899–1914, London: Methuen, 1938.
 N.B. Leslie, Battle Honours of the British and Indian Armies 1695–1914, London: Leo Cooper, 1970, .
 Ray Westlake, Tracing the Rifle Volunteers, Barnsley: Pen and Sword, 2010, .

Volunteer Infantry Brigades of the British Army
Military units and formations in Derbyshire
Military units and formations in Derby
Military units and formations in Leicestershire
Military units and formations in Lincolnshire
Military units and formations in Nottinghamshire
Military units and formations established in 1888
Military units and formations disestablished in 1908
1908 disestablishments in the United Kingdom